The 1994–95 Club Universidad Nacional season is the 40th season in the football club's history and the 32nd consecutive season in the top flight division of Mexican football.

Summary
In summertime President Guillermo Aguilar Alvarez sold midfielder Miguel España to Tigres UANL and centre back defender Juan de Dios Ramirez Perales to CF Monterrey reinforcing the squad with the transfers in of Mike Sorber loaned from Major League Soccer which inaugural season was delayed until 1996, midfielder Pedro Massacessi another loan from Atlante FC and Chilean Forward Juan Carreño. The average age of the players was the lowest of the entire league Division in a sign of austerity for upcoming years due to the Mexican peso crisis which hit the Federal Government Budget included state universities around the country such as: Tigres UANL, Correcaminos UAT, Leones Negros UdeG and, of course, even Pumas UNAM.  

However, the young Pumas delivered a decent season despite the low level of its offensive line but a talented midfield with good performances by Braulio Luna, Antonio Sancho, Rafael "Chiquis" Garcia (club topscorer) and playmaker Tiba getting a good streak without a lost match during almost the whole second half of the season. Although, the defensive line had a poor start after a massive 2-6 defeat at Estadio Morelos then goalkeeper Jorge Campos, Oteo, Suarez and newly arrived left back Miguel A. Carreon improved their campaign helping to finish in a 6th spot in league and reached the quarterfinals against Cruz Azul being eliminated after two exciting matches with a last minute goal scored by right back defender Guadalupe Castañeda.

Squad

Transfers

Winter

Competitions

La Liga

League table

Group 1

General table

Results by round

Matches

References

External links

1994–95 Mexican Primera División season
1994–95 in Mexican football